Shabika Gajnabi (born 14 July 2000) is a Guyanese cricketer who plays for Guyana, Guyana Amazon Warriors and the West Indies. She plays as a right-arm medium bowler. In August 2019, she was named in the West Indies' squad for their series against Australia. She made her Women's One Day International (WODI) debut for the West Indies against Australia on 5 September 2019. She made her Women's Twenty20 International (WT20I) debut for the West Indies, also against Australia, on 14 September 2019.

In June 2021, Gajnabi was named as the vice-captain of the West Indies A Team for their series against Pakistan. In October 2021, she was named as one of three reserve players in the West Indies team for the 2021 Women's Cricket World Cup Qualifier tournament in Zimbabwe.

References

External links

2000 births
Living people
Guyanese women cricketers
West Indian women cricketers
West Indies women One Day International cricketers
West Indies women Twenty20 International cricketers
Guyana Amazon Warriors (WCPL) cricketers
Guyanese people of Indian descent